Central Valley School District No. 356 is a K–12 public school district located in Spokane Valley and Liberty Lake, Washington.  Over 14,100 students attend one of the twenty-one schools within the district.

History
The school district was founded in 1890 as Vera District. Going to school was difficult, especially compared to modern standard, as there was no good transportation system and little funding.

In the 1920s, Vera District, as well as four near by school districts were consolidated. Vera, Greenacres, Liberty Lake, Saltese, and Lone Fir school districts were merged to make the district more effective. The consolidation caused overcrowding at the high school, which was built in 1912.

To adapt to life after World War II, the County Superintendent of Schools, W. F. Standeford, changed the district into what is known today as Central Valley School District No. 356 and started building new schools funded by a levy. This was necessary as the post-war baby boomers cause an influx of children that crowded the system.

Later there was need for another high school. In 1960, the two-year construction of University High School began. Its new teaching methods garnered the district national recognition. Eventually both University High School and Central Valley High School became outdated and crowded. Both schools were built anew in 2002, mirror images of each other except for the building orientation and brick color.

Schools

High schools
Central Valley High School
University High School
 Ridgeline High School
Mica Peak High School (Alternative High School)

Middle schools
 Bowdish Middle School
 Evergreen Middle School
 Greenacres Middle School
 Horizon Middle School
 North Pines Middle School
 Selkirk Middle School

Elementary schools
Adams Elementary School
Broadway Elementary School
Chester Elementary School
Greenacres Elementary School
Liberty Lake Elementary School
Liberty Creek Elementary School
McDonald Elementary School
Opportunity Elementary School
Ponderosa Elementary School
Progress Elementary School
Riverbend Elementary School
South Pines Elementary School
Sunrise Elementary School
University Elementary School

Levy
In 2012, a replacement levy to support the school district was approved. The cost is $3.54 per $1,000.00 assessed property value. The previous levy expired (it was still in effect when the replacement was proposed) at the end of 2012. It is expected to earn over $27 million annually to pay for maintenance and operational costs. As opposed to older levies, this levy does not allocate funds for any new construction.

The district gets funding from other taxes/sources.

References

External links
 

School districts in Washington (state)
Public school districts in Spokane County, Washington
School districts established in 1890
1890 establishments in Washington (state)
Education in Spokane, Washington
Spokane Valley, Washington